The Raintree Hotel St. Mary's Road is a five-star hotel located at Alwarpet in Chennai, India. It was the fifth hotel in India and the first in South India to get "Ecotel" certification.

The Hotel
The Raintree Hotel has a total of 108 rooms. The restaurants at the hotel include The Colony, a multi-cuisine restaurant, Chap Chay, an Asian delicacies restaurant, Havana Club, and Above Sea Level, the 14th-level rooftop resto-bar. There are three banquet halls and two conference venues which totals to 4200 sq ft of banqueting space. The hotel also has a pool at the roof-top along with a health club.

The interiors were designed by Mumbai-based Prakash Mankar & Associates.

Awards
Good Green Governance Award; Presented by the Srishti Publications - 2006
 Best Participating Team award by the Indian Federation of Culinary Association (IFCA) at the Culinary Challenge and Exhibition 2008, Chennai - September 2008.
Exnora Green Hotel Award; Presented by Exnora International - 2008 
Golden Peacock Award (Environment Management); Presented by the World Council for Corporate Governance – 2008
Tourism Promotion Award; Presented by The Hindu - 2008 
MMA Award for Managerial Excellence (Services Sector); Presented by the Madras Management Association – 2009
Green Chariot Award; Presented by Rotary Club of Madras Southwest – 2010
Times Food Award for Best Oriental Cuisine; Presented by Times of India – 2011 
NDTV Hindu Lifestyle Award for Best Eco Hotel; Presented by NDTV Hindu – 2011
Audi Ritz Icon Award for Best Roof Top Restaurant (Above Sea Level Resto-Bar); Presented by Ritz – 2011
Business Gaurav SME Award 2011- Hospitality; Presented by D & B – Axis Bank – 2011

See also

 Hotels in Chennai
 List of tallest buildings in Chennai

References

External links
http://www.raintreehotels.com/

Hotels in Chennai
Skyscraper hotels in Chennai
Hotels established in 2005
Hotel buildings completed in 2005
2005 establishments in Tamil Nadu